Patricio Alejandro Abraham (born 19 March 1982) is an Argentine former footballer who played as a   goalkeeper.

He played for Chilean side Coquimbo Unido.

References

External links
 
 
 Patricio Abraham at playmakerstats.com (English version of ceroacero.es)

1982 births
Living people
Footballers from Rosario, Santa Fe
Argentine footballers
Argentine expatriate footballers
Club Atlético Douglas Haig players
Club Atlético Tigre footballers
Club Atlético Platense footballers
San Telmo footballers
Club Atlético Sarmiento footballers
Club Almagro players
Sportivo Las Parejas footballers
Coquimbo Unido footballers
Juventud de Pergamino footballers
Torneo Argentino A players
Primera Nacional players
Primera B Metropolitana players
Primera B de Chile players
Torneo Argentino B players
Argentine expatriate sportspeople in Chile
Expatriate footballers in Chile
Association football goalkeepers